James Draper (9 March 1925 – 10 January 2013) was a South African cricket umpire. He stood in five Test matches between 1964 and 1970.

See also
 List of Test cricket umpires

References

1925 births
2013 deaths
Cricketers from Durban
South African Test cricket umpires